The Hästveda railway station is located on Östra Järnvägsgatan in the locality of Hästveda, in Hässleholm Municipality, Skåne County, Sweden.

The station opened with the arrival of the railway in the 1860s. No trains stopped at the station between 1975 and 2013. 

As part of a plan to increase local passenger traffic in southern Sweden, the station was rebuilt and refurbished between 2011 and 2013. It was re-inaugurated on December 14, 2013, with regular passenger traffic starting on the following day. , the station is served by the Växjö–Hässleholm route of the  regional rail network.

References 

Railway stations in Skåne County